Joel Chasnoff (born December 15, 1973) is an American-Israeli stand-up comedian and writer with stage and screen credits in eight countries, and author of the comic memoir The 188th Crybaby Brigade, about his year as a tank soldier in the Israeli Army.

Early life
Joel Chasnoff grew up in Chicago, Illinois, in a Conservative Jewish household with his parents and two younger brothers. He attended Solomon Schechter Day School, where he describes himself as the smallest boy in his class and relied on humor to stand out.

His second-grade teacher, who was a native of Israel, helped inspire his connection to Israel. As a teen he traveled to Israel several times, including at age 13 with his family. He returned for a second trip at age 17, and later co-led a six-week Jewish teen tour to Poland and Israel. He was impressed by Israeli soldiers when he visited, and said he felt guilty about not doing something to help defend the country himself.

Israeli Defense Forces
After graduating from the University of Pennsylvania, and a half-hearted attempt at a stand-up career in New York City, Chasnoff immigrated to Israel and enlisted in the Israel Defense Forces at age 24. From 1997 to 1998 he served as a tank gunner in the 188th Armored Brigade in south Lebanon.
His unit was responsible for defending Israel’s north, including the Golan Heights and the Syrian border. His service included two months of Basic Training, two months of Tank School, three months of Advanced Warfare Training, followed by a tour of duty in South Lebanon, where he participated in operations against Hezbollah. During one such operation, Chasnoff wreaked havoc when he refused to fire on a pair of enemy combatants in an Open Fire Zone. After an investigation, it was determined that the combatants were actually Dutch United Nations soldiers who had wandered into the Open Fire Zone by accident, and Chasnoff was exonerated of charges of disobedience.

During his time of service Chasnoff attempted to marry his Israeli girlfriend, only to discover that he was not considered halakhically Jewish by the official Rabbinate of Israel and was thus unable to marry in the Jewish state.

Comedy
Chasnoff continued to pursue comedy after leaving the IDF, first at the Improv Olympic in Chicago and eventually in New York. He now has stage and screen credits in eight countries, including the U.S., Israel, Canada, England, Switzerland, Japan, Korea, and Singapore. He's been the warm-up act for Jon Stewart and Lewis Black of The Daily Show, and went on a USO Comedy Tour of the Far East entertaining American Marines. He has performed at more than 1,000 comedy clubs, colleges, festivals, and Jewish events across North America, Israel, and Europe.
His comedy, both stand-up and written, relies on non-degrading observations about the details of American life and his Jewish upbringing.

The 188th Crybaby Brigade
On February 9, 2010 Simon & Schuster published Chasnoff's comedic memoir about his experiences in the IDF. In August 2010 it climbed to #3 on the Denver Post bestseller list.

Personal life
Chasnoff lives in Ra'anana, Israel with his wife, a native-born Israeli, and their children.

Publishing History
The 188th Crybaby Brigade: A Skinny Jewish Kid from Chicago Fights Hezbollah - A Memoir By: Joel Chasnoff, (Simon & Schuster, February 9, 2010)
The Big Book of Jewish Humor, William Novak, Moshe Waldoks, (Collins, 2006)
The Complete Idiot's Guide to Jokes, Larry Getlen, (Alpha, September 5, 2006)

References

External links

Joel Chasnoff on YouTube

Living people
Male actors from New York City
Jewish American comedians
American stand-up comedians
Male actors from Chicago
1973 births
University of Pennsylvania alumni
Israeli soldiers
Comedians from New York City
Comedians from Illinois
21st-century American comedians
21st-century American Jews